"Life Goes On" is a song by American alternative hip hop band Gym Class Heroes, released October 18, 2011 as the first promotional single from their fifth studio album The Papercut Chronicles II. The song, produced by Emile Haynie, features vocals from Danish singer-songwriter and record producer Oh Land.

The official audio, was uploaded to YouTube on October 18, 2011 at a total length of four minutes and twelve seconds.

Track listing

Release history

References

2011 songs
Gym Class Heroes songs
Oh Land songs
Song recordings produced by Emile Haynie
Songs written by Travie McCoy
Songs written by Matt McGinley
Songs written by Emile Haynie